Günter Friedrich Wilhelm Döding (4 September 1930 – 8 August 2005) was a German trade union leader.

Born in Isenstedt, Döding worked as a coal miner before becoming a cigar sorter.  He joined the Food, Beverages and Catering Union (NGG), and soon began working for it full-time in Wuppertal.  In 1956, he joined the union's national executive as youth secretary, and was given charge of the NGG's tobacco sector.

In 1966, Döding became vice president of the NGG, then in 1978 was elected as its president.  As leader of the union, he championed early retirement policies for workers, an environmental tax and new laws on working hours.  His policy views attracted attention, and in 1985 he set them out fully in a book, Die neuen Aufgaben der Gewerkschaften.

Döding was elected as president of the International Union of Food, Agricultural, Hotel, Restaurant, Tobacco and Allied Workers' Associations in 1981.  In 1988, he was implicated in an accounting scandal at co op AG, leading him to retire from his union positions.

References

1930 births
2005 deaths
German trade union leaders
People from Minden-Lübbecke